Pottle may refer to:

Surname
Bill Pottle (born 1978), American author of books on fantasy, martial arts, and Christianity
Emory B. Pottle (1815–1891), U.S. Representative from New York
Gilbert Emery Bensley Pottle (1875–1945), American actor who appeared in over 80 movies
Herbert Pottle (1907–2002), Canadian politician, civil servant, magistrate and writer
Pat Pottle (1938–2000), founding member of the Committee of 100, an anti-nuclear direct action group
Patty Pottle, Canadian politician in Newfoundland and Labrador
Sam Pottle (1934–1978), American composer, conductor, and musical director

Places
Pottle Bay, a natural bay on the coast of Labrador in the province of Newfoundland and Labrador, Canada
Pottle, Annagelliff, a townland of County Cavan, Ireland

Other uses
Pottle (unit), a unit of volume, equal to two quarts or half a gallon
Pottle, an old form of the name of the River Poddle, Dublin, Ireland

See also
Bottle (disambiguation)
Patle
Pootle